"Lean wit Me" is a song by American rapper and singer Juice Wrld. It was included as the seventh song on his debut studio album Goodbye & Good Riddance (2018). "Lean wit Me" was released as the third single a day ahead of the album on May 22, 2018. The song was written by Juice Wrld and producer Nick Mira.

Upon its release, "Lean wit Me" received positive reviews from contemporary music critics. In the United States, it peaked at number sixty-eight on the U.S. Billboard Hot 100 chart. The single has since been certified Platinum by the Recording Industry Association of America (RIAA). An accompanying music video was directed by Sherif Alabede and depicts Higgins's long battle with  drug addiction alongside his girlfriend. It features a message promoting the National Drug and Alcohol Treatment Hotline (1-800-662-4357).

Background
"Lean Wit Me" serves as the third single from debut studio album Goodbye & Good Riddance. As one of the more personal tracks on the album, the song is a reflection on addiction. It addresses Juice WRLD's issues with substance abuse.

Composition
"Lean Wit Me" is a midtempo hip hop track that lasts for a duration of two minutes and fifty-five seconds. Like his previous records, "Lean Wit Me" is an agonizing melodic rap song. The songwriting contains dark lyrical themes with a strong fixation on addiction and contemplations of mortality. The lyrics are laced with references pertaining to narcotics and binging, relating how substance abuse can lead to self-destruction and tragic romance. As the lyrical narrative unfolds, Juice WRLD suffers from the consequences of overindulgence as he rhymes, "Fucked up liver with some bad kidneys." Throughout the musical composition, his melodic vocal style often verges on melancholic crooning.

Critical reception
"Lean Wit Me" received positive reviews from contemporary music journalists. Aaron Williams for Uproxx complimented Juice WRLD's lyricism, claiming that the songwriter "details substance abuse that could make Future think twice about his decisions."

Chart performance
In the United States, "Lean Wit Me" made its first chart appearance  on the Billboard Hot 100, debuting at number 87 on August 17, 2018, with 10.9 million U.S. streams and 1,000 digital downloads. That very same week, the single entered at number 44 on the Hot R&B/Hip-Hop Songs chart. The next week, "Lean Wit Me" climbed three places to reach number 84 on the Billboard Hot 100 chart. In the end, the song ascended to its peak position at number 68 on the Hot 100 for the issue dated September 1, 2018, which was its third week on the chart. It eventually peaked at number 26 on the Hot R&B/Hip-Hop Songs chart for the issue dated September 1, 2018. "Lean Wit Me" entered and peaked at number 21 on the US Hot Rap Songs chart. In Canada, the song debuted at number 93 on the Canadian Hot 100 chart, where it reached number 79.
 On December 11, 2018, "Lean Wit Me" was certified Platinum by the Recording Industry Association of America (RIAA) for sales of one million paid digital downloads. As of November 2021, the music video has 238,314,043 views.

Music video

Background
The accompanying music video for "Lean Wit Me" was directed by Los Angeles filmmaker Sherif Alabede. Known for his narrative-driven visuals, Aladebe has a signature dark aesthetic that aims to leave a lasting impression on audiences. Juice WRLD and Alabede sought to a create dark video which provided a cautionary tale regarding the consequences of recreational drug use. The video features Juice WRLD attending a group therapy session. Alabede admitted that he was not very familiar with Juice Wrld's musical style prior to being contacted to direct the video. However, he was informed of Juice WRLD's emo rap approach and was impressed by his authenticity. Sherif Alabede used an Alcoholics Anonymous meeting to frame the visual narrative. To further the feeling of authenticity, the extras included in the video weren't actors and are instead actual recovering alcoholics.

Synopsis

The music video opens with Juice WRLD at a twelve-step program meeting. He takes part in saying a Serenity Prayer in unison with the group and sits on a metal folding chair in a circle. The group leader requests the artist introduce himself and share his story, which segues into the song. Juice sings his backstory as he dances around the circle. It is revealed that his character found his way to therapy following the death of his girlfriend. Throughout the video, there are shifts between segments of Juice WRLD at the meeting and flashback scenes where he is with his lover. The couple both revel in the ecstasy of substance abuse and struggle with their addiction. They are depicted in various states of dependency, from laying on the floor surrounded by pills to getting arrested in a convenience store. It culminates with Juice WRLD calling 911 to report that his girlfriend has overdosed on prescription drugs. The music video ends on a black screen with a message promoting the National Drug and Alcohol Treatment Hotline. It reads: "RIP to too many young legends that left us early. If you or somebody you know is suffering from addiction call 1-800-662-HELP to take the first step."

Reception
Upon its release, the music video was met with general acclaim praised for its dark imagery. The music Aaron Williams from Uproxx stated that with the video, Juice WRLD delivered a harrowing statement on substance abuse. Tosten Burks of XXL Magazine claimed, "The clip's tone and stakes match the self-destruction in Juice's writing."

Personnel
Credits adapted from Tidal.
 Juice Wrld – writing
 Nick Mira – writing, production
 Enviyon Recording Studios – mixing

Charts

Certifications

References

External links

2018 singles
Juice Wrld songs
Interscope Records singles
Songs written by Juice Wrld
Songs about drugs
Songs written by Nick Mira